Paul Duncan Crawford (born 21 August 1947, Toronto) is a Canadian composer, radio producer, organist, and music educator. In 1967 he received a licentiate diploma from Trinity College London and in 1971 he earned a Bachelor of Music degree from McGill University.

References

1947 births
Living people
Canadian composers
Canadian male composers
Canadian organists
Male organists
McGill University School of Music alumni
Canadian music educators
21st-century organists
21st-century Canadian male musicians